The 2023 European Youth Olympic Winter Festival was held in Friuli-Venezia Giulia, Italy, between 21 and 28 January 2023. This was Italy's second time as host of the winter festival after  Aosta 1993. As the 2003 Winter Universiade, in addition of Italy, several events were held in Austria and Slovenia.

Sports
The following competitions will take place

Freestyle skiing and ski mountaineering will make their EYOF debut. Medals are awarded in record 59 events in 12 sports, compared to 39 in 9 sports at the previous edition.

Venues

Schedule
The competition schedule for the 2023 European Youth Olympic Winter Festival is as follows:

Participant nations
47 nations are expected to participate:

Medal table

References

External links

FVG 2023 Sport data overview

European Youth Olympic Winter Festival
European Youth Olympic Winter Festival
European Youth Olympic Winter Festival
Youth Winter Olympic Festival
European Youth Olympic Winter Festival
European Youth Olympic Winter Festival
Multi-sport events in Italy
European Youth Winter Olympic Festival
Youth sport in Italy
Sport in Friuli-Venezia Giulia